Russell "Russ" Wilcox (born 25 March 1964) is an English former professional footballer who is currently manager of Farsley Celtic. 

Wilcox played as a defender between 1980 and 2003 and spent the final six years of his career with Scunthorpe United which is where he began working under Brian Laws. Wilcox would act as Laws' assistant at Glanford Park from 2003 to 2006 before following him on to further jobs at Sheffield Wednesday and Burnley. The pair returned to Scunthorpe in 2012 and in November 2013 Wilcox succeeded Laws as manager of the club, taking Scunthorpe to promotion. A poor start to the following year's campaign saw Wilcox sacked from Scunthorpe and he was then recruited by York City. Another poor start to a season saw Wilcox sacked by York City in October 2015. Wilcox came back to Scunthorpe again as the caretaker manager until the end of the 2019–20 season following the dismissal of Paul Hurst.

Club career
Wilcox was born in Hemsworth, West Riding of Yorkshire. He started his career with Doncaster Rovers as an apprentice, and made his first team debut aged 17 when starting the last match of their 1980–81 Fourth Division promotion winning season, a 1–1 away draw with Mansfield Town on 6 May 1981. His progress the following season was disrupted through injury, and he left for a brief spell with Cambridge United of the Second Division. Wilcox dropped into non-League football to play for Alliance Premier League club Frickley Athletic during 1982–83.

He returned to the professional game when he joined Fourth Division club Northampton Town for a £15,000 fee on 30 June 1986. He later played for Hull City, Preston North End and Scunthorpe United. He played the majority of his career at Scunthorpe, where he was signed by Brian Laws in 1997. He eventually became player-assistant manager to Laws in 1999 after the win at Wembley Stadium in the play-off final against Leyton Orient.

International career
Wilcox earned two caps and scored one goal for the England national semi-pro team, in matches against the Republic of Ireland and Wales in 1986.

Coaching and managerial career

When Brian Laws was sacked in 2004, Wilcox took temporary control of the Glanford Park club for four games, until Laws was reinstated. When Laws returned to the club, Wilcox reverted to his original role of assistant manager. In 2006, Laws left Scunthorpe when he was appointed manager of Sheffield Wednesday, Wilcox shortly followed him to take up the assistant manager's role at Hillsborough Stadium.

On 13 January 2010, he joined Premier League club Burnley as assistant manager, yet again moving to work under Brian Laws. He left Burnley in December 2010.

On 30 November 2011 at a fans forum, Wilcox was named as the new assistant manager of League One club AFC Bournemouth, working alongside manager Lee Bradbury. On 30 October 2012 he and Laws returned to manage League One side Scunthorpe United replacing former manager Alan Knill who was sacked following a string of poor results and poor performances. This will be the third time he and Brian Laws have worked together at Scunthorpe. Laws was dismissed on 20 November 2013 with Wilcox taking over on a caretaker basis. On 24 December 2013 Wilcox was confirmed as permanent manager of the club on a 12-month rolling contract.

On 12 April 2014, Wilcox broke the record for the longest unbeaten run at the beginning of a managerial reign, with a draw against Bury being his 26th game in charge without defeat. In total, Wilcox managed 28 consecutive games without defeat, with his first loss coming in the penultimate game of the season on 26 April 2014 away to Exeter City. Results elsewhere meant that Scunthorpe secured promotion on that day regardless. Scunthorpe won just two of their first eleven matches back in League One, which resulted in Wilcox being sacked on 8 October 2014.

A week after leaving Scunthorpe Wilcox was appointed as the new manager of League Two club York City on 15 October 2014, following the resignation of Nigel Worthington. He was sacked on 26 October 2015, with York fourth-bottom of the table after a run of nine league matches without a win.

After the departure of Paul Hurst in January 2020, Wilcox was appointed caretaker manager, and remained until the end of the season. He was appointed manager of Farsley Celtic in February 2022.

Personal life
His son Joe Wilcox, born 1989, is a former professional footballer, who was a trainee at Scunthorpe United before playing in non-League football.

Career statistics

Managerial statistics

Honours

As a player
Northampton Town
Football League Fourth Division: 1986–87

Preston North End
Football League Third Division: 1995–96

Scunthorpe United
Football League Third Division play-offs: 1999

Individual
PFA Team of the Year: 1994–95 Third Division, 1995–96 Third Division

References

External links

1964 births
Living people
People from Hemsworth
English footballers
England semi-pro international footballers
Association football defenders
Doncaster Rovers F.C. players
Cambridge United F.C. players
Frickley Athletic F.C. players
Northampton Town F.C. players
Hull City A.F.C. players
Preston North End F.C. players
Scunthorpe United F.C. players
English Football League players
National League (English football) players
English football managers
Scunthorpe United F.C. managers
York City F.C. managers
English Football League managers
Association football coaches
Scunthorpe United F.C. non-playing staff
Sheffield Wednesday F.C. non-playing staff
Burnley F.C. non-playing staff
AFC Bournemouth non-playing staff
Doncaster Rovers F.C. non-playing staff
Farsley Celtic F.C. managers